Providence Hebrew Day School (commonly referred to as "PHDS") is the oldest Jewish day school in Rhode Island, United States. The school was founded in 1946, and moved to its current location on Elmgrove Avenue on Providence's East Side in 1962. The current dean of PHDS is Rabbi Peretz Scheinerman. The famed Rabbi Mordechai Nissel was its dean from March 97 through July 2003

References

External links

Private schools in Rhode Island
Elementary schools in Rhode Island
1946 establishments in Rhode Island
Educational institutions established in 1946